Benjamin Scott Chapman (born 31 December 1998) is an English professional footballer who plays for Ebbsfleet United as a central midfielder.

Club career
Born in Aylesford, Chapman had stints at Crystal Palace and Bearsted's youth setups before graduating with Gillingham. On 14 March 2017, he signed a professional deal with the club. He made his professional debut on 8 August 2017, coming on as a substitute for Jake Hessenthaler in a 2–0 away loss against Reading in the EFL Cup.

Chapman was offered a new contract by Gillingham at the end of the 2018–19 season, but chose instead to sign for National League South side Dulwich Hamlet.

On 24 July 2020 Chapman signed for National League South side Ebbsfleet United. At the end of the 2021/22 season, he was voted the club's Supporters' Player of the Year.

References

External links

1998 births
Living people
Sportspeople from Aylesbury
English footballers
Association football midfielders
English Football League players
National League (English football) players
Gillingham F.C. players
Dulwich Hamlet F.C. players
Ebbsfleet United F.C. players
People from Aylesford
Footballers from Buckinghamshire